Below the Deadline is a 1946 American crime film directed by William Beaudine and starring Warren Douglas, Ramsay Ames and Jan Wiley.

Main cast
 Warren Douglas as Joe Hilton  
 Ramsay Ames as Lynn Turner 
 Jan Wiley as Vivian Saunders  
 Paul Maxey as Arthur Brennan  
 Philip Van Zandt as Oney Kessel  
 John Harmon as Pinky  
 Bruce Edwards as Samuel P. Austin  
 George Meeker as Jeffrey Hilton  
 Clancy Cooper as Nichols  
 Cay Forrester as Blonde  
 Al Bridge as Turner  
 George Eldredge as James S. Vail  
 William Ruhl as Welsh  
 Vera Pavlovska as Russian Singer  
 Charles Sullivan as Charlie - Kessel Henchman  
 Meyer Grace as Kessel Henchman  
 George Lloyd as Kane - Club Owner

References

Bibliography
 Spicer, Andrew. Historical Dictionary of Film Noir. Scarecrow Press, 2010.

External links
 

1946 films
1946 crime films
1940s English-language films
American crime films
Films directed by William Beaudine
Monogram Pictures films
American black-and-white films
1940s American films